Conus olssoni is an extinct species of sea snail, a marine gastropod mollusk in the family Conidae, the cone snails, cone shells or cones.

Description
The size of the shell varies between 22 mm and 46 mm.

Distribution
This extinct species is known in the fossil state from the Neogene of the Dominican Republic

References

 Hendricks J.R. (2015). Glowing seashells: diversity of fossilized coloration patterns on coral reef-associated cone snail (Gastropoda: Conidae) shells from the Neogene of the Dominican Republic. PLoS ONE. 10(4): e0120924

External links
 To World Register of Marine Species

olssoni